Henry Henderson (1843, Perthshire, Scotland12 February 1891, Quilimane, Mozambique) was a lay Church of Scotland missionary in present-day Malawi. He founded the Blantyre Mission in Malawi.

Henderson was the son of a Church of Scotland minister. He studied briefly at the University of Edinburgh, and then worked briefly in Queensland, Australia. In 1875, he volunteered to represent the Church of Scotland in an endeavour by the Free Church of Scotland to establish a mission in the Lake Malawi region in memory of medical missionary and explorer David Livingstone (1813-73). In 1876, Chief Kapeni gave Henderson land at modern Blantyre (named after Livingstone's birthplace) to create a Church of Scotland mission. There were difficulties in the early years: some of the missionaries had unrealistic expectations, and were indisciplined. In 1881, Rev. Duff MacDonald (who had headed the mission since 1878) and some other missionaries were dismissed. After the appointment of Rev. David C. Scott to head the mission, Henderson expanded its activities to Zomba, Domasi and Mulanje. He died in 1891, on a return journey to Scotland.

A river steamer, Henry Henderson, purchased by Blantyre Mission in 1892, was named in his honour. She was manned by African graduates of the Mission, and operated as a floating church and school on Shire River, the largest river in Malawi. The Henry Henderson Institute, an educational institute in Blantyre, was named in his honour; it now lies within the grounds of St Michael and All Angels Church, Blantyre.

References 

1843 births
Date of birth missing
Place of birth missing
People from Perthshire
1891 deaths
Alumni of the University of Edinburgh
Scottish Presbyterian missionaries
British emigrants to Malawi
Presbyterian missionaries in Malawi